The Texas Neurosciences Institute (TNI) is the name of a medical office building in San Antonio, Texas.

The building is adjacent to the University of Texas Health Science Center medical school.  Medical specialties in the building include pediatrics, pediatric hematology/oncology, gastroenterology, neurosurgery, internal medicine, etc.  There are also diagnostic labs and radiology imaging centers located there.

See also
South Texas Medical Center

References

External links
Official Website

South Texas Medical Center
Neuroscience research centers in the United States
Medical research institutes in Texas